Jafarbagi may refer to:

Jafarbagi-ye Olya
Jafarbagi-ye Sofla